Victoria Chambers is a commercial building on Victoria Street in Dundee, Scotland. Designed by newly appointed Dundee City Architect William Alexander, it is a Category B listed building dating to 1874.

Cleaning work performed in the 1950s softened the building's stonework detail somewhat.

The building is now halls for students of the Abertay University.

See also
List of listed buildings in Dundee

References

Government buildings completed in 1874
1874 establishments in Scotland
Category B listed buildings in Dundee
Listed government buildings in Scotland